Low-dispersion glass (LD glass) is a type of glass with a reduction in chromatic aberration (less rainbow effect). Crown glass is an example of a relatively inexpensive low-dispersion glass.

Special low dispersion glass (SLD glass) and extraordinary low-dispersion glass (ELD glass) are glasses with yet lower dispersion (and yet higher price). Other glasses in this class are extra-low-dispersion glass (ED glass), and ultra-low-dispersion glass (UL glass).

Application
Low-dispersion glasses are particularly used to reduce chromatic aberration, most often used in achromatic doublets. The positive element is made of a low-dispersion glass, the negative element from a high-dispersion glass. To counteract the effect of the negative lens, the positive lens has to be thicker. Achromatic doublets therefore have higher thickness and weight than the equivalent non-chromatic-corrected single lenses.

In comparison to telephoto lenses, shorter focal length objectives benefit less from low-dispersion elements, as their chief problem is spherical aberration instead of chromatic aberration. The spherical aberration introduced by the LD elements can be corrected with aspheric lens elements. The increased sharpness provided by SLD elements allows using lower f-numbers and therefore faster shutter speed. This is critical, e.g., in sports photography and wildlife photography. The shallow depth of field provided by a telephoto lens also allows the subject of the photography to stand out better against the background.

Low-dispersion glasses are also employed in handling ultrashort pulses of light, in e.g. mode-locked lasers, to prevent pulse broadening by group velocity dispersion in the optical elements.

Infrared corrected special-low-dispersion glass also has benefits to CCTV cameras. The low chromatic aberration of SLD glass allows the lens to always stay in focus, from visible light to infrared.

In binoculars, ED (extra-low dispersion) glass (also sometimes referred to as a high density - HD - glass) is a high quality optical glass that increases light transmission, decreases light dispersion, and so cuts down on chromatic aberration, or "color fringing", which is due to the splitting of the light spectrum. It is used in binocular objective lenses to help focus the light waves of the color spectrum on the human eye, and to deliver bright, sharp images. ED lenses are composed of a specific formulation that contains rare-earth elements. However, there is no ED standard that dictates the materials that must be used in ED lenses. Therefore, the quality of ED glass can vary.

Variants
Some glasses have a peculiar property called anomalous partial dispersion. Their use in long-focal-length lens assemblies was pioneered by Leitz. Before their availability, calcium fluoride in the form of fluorite crystals were used as material for these lenses; however the low refraction index of calcium fluoride required high curvatures of the lenses, therefore increasing spherical aberration. Fluorite has poor shape retention and is very fragile. Abnormal dispersion is required for design of apochromat lenses.

Glass with addition of thorium dioxide has high refraction and low dispersion and was in use since before World War II, but its radioactivity led to its replacement with other compositions. Even during WWII, Kodak managed to make high-performance thorium-free optical glass for use in aerial photography, but it was yellow-tinted. In combination with black and white film, the tint was actually beneficial, improving contrast by acting as an ultraviolet filter.

Leitz laboratories discovered that lanthanum(III) oxide can be a suitable thorium dioxide replacement. Other elements however had to be added to preserve the amorphous character of the glass and prevent crystallization that would cause striae defects.

After 1930, George W. Morey introduced the lanthanum oxide and oxides of other rare-earth elements in borate glasses, greatly expanding the available range of high-index low-dispersion glasses. Borate glasses have lower wavelength-refraction dependence in the blue region of spectrum than silicate glasses with the same Abbe number. These so-called "borate flint" glasses, or KZFS, are however highly susceptible to corrosion by acids, alkalis, and weather factors. However borate glass with more than 20 mol.% of lanthanum oxide is very durable under ambient conditions. The use of rare earths allowed development of high-index low-dispersion glasses of both crown and flint types.

Another high-performance glass contains high proportion of zirconium dioxide; however its high melting point requires use of platinum lined crucibles to prevent contamination with crucible material.

A good high-refraction replacement for calcium fluoride as a lens material can be a fluorophosphate glass. Here, a proportion of fluorides is stabilized with a metaphosphate, with addition of titanium dioxide.

Several of the mentioned high-performance glasses are expensive because highly pure chemicals must be produced in substantial quantities.

See also
 Aspheric lens
 Achromatic lens
 Abbe number
 Diffraction-limited system
 Material dispersion coefficient

References

External links
 Lens Specifications

Glass compositions